
Gmina Nakło nad Notecią is an urban-rural gmina (administrative district) in Nakło County, Kuyavian-Pomeranian Voivodeship, in north-central Poland.

Villages
Apart from the town of Nakło nad Notecią, Gmina Nakło nad Notecią contains the villages and settlements of Anielin, Bielawy, Bogacin, Chrząstowo, Elżbiecin, Gabrielin, Gorzeń, Gostusza, Gumnowice, Janowo, Karnówko, Karnowo, Kazin, Kaźmierowo, Lubaszcz, Małocin, Michalin, Minikowo, Niedola, Nowakówko, Olszewka, Paterek, Piętacz, Polichno, Potulice, Rozwarzyn, Ślesin, Suchary, Trzeciewnica, Urszulin, Wieszki and Występ.

Neighbouring gminas
Gmina Nakło nad Notecią is bordered by the gminas of Białe Błota, Kcynia, Mrocza, Sadki, Sicienko and Szubin.

References
   Polish official population figures 2019 

Naklo nad Notecia
Nakło County